The Kia EV9 is an upcoming all-electric mid-size crossover SUV produced by Kia. It is the second Kia model developed on the Electric Global Modular Platform (E-GMP). It is also the second model in the manufacturer's "EV" electric car range after the EV6.

On March 14, 2023, Kia officially unveiled the production version of the EV9, featuring a similar design to the concept, as well as second-row seats that rotate 180 degrees.

Overview

Concept
The EV9 was first unveiled as the Kia EV9 Concept at the 2021 Los Angeles Auto Show, featuring 3 rows of seats. The concept car features an interior that can transform into a meeting room.

Production
Kia unveiled the silhouette of the production EV9 via an internet teaser on 3 March 2023. The EV9 was officially presented on March 14, with production set to begin in Gwangmyeong, South Korea in the first half of the same year.

Design
However, details like battery size and powertrain won't be revealed until the official debut in early April. The production version retains many design elements from the original EV9 concept, which was first shown in November 2021.

Kia said that it is "formed from a polygonal design language" that uses "triangular fender structures and highly pronounced geometric wheel arches that combine with the fuselage body." Kia also says the EV9 is very aerodynamic, although it has many lines and edges.

References

External links
 Official website

EV6
Cars introduced in 2023
Mid-size sport utility vehicles
Crossover sport utility vehicles
Production electric cars
All-wheel-drive vehicles